Al-Kunayyisa was a small Palestinian Arab village in the Ramle Subdistrict. It was depopulated during the 1948 Arab–Israeli War on July 10, 1948, under the first stage of Operation Dani. It was located 12 km southeast of Ramla.

History
In 1838, it was noted it was noted as a place "in ruins or deserted”, called  el-Kuneiseh   in the   Lydda District.

In 1883, the PEF's Survey of Western Palestine (SWP)  noted "Foundations and traces of ruins."

British Mandate era
In the 1931 census of Palestine  Al-Kunayyisa  was counted with Innaba, together they  had 1135 Muslim inhabitants, in 288 houses.

In   the 1945 statistics Al-Kunayyisa had a population of 40  Muslims, with  3,872  dunams of land.  Of this, a 64 dunams were used for plantations and irrigable land, 2,432 were used for cereals,  while 20 dunams were classified as built-up   areas.

A khirba to the east contains rugged stone walls and  building remains.

1948, aftermath
Al-Kunayyisa became depopulated after a military assault on July 10, 1948.

On 20 August 1948, Al-Kunayyisa was one of 32 Palestinian villagers whose land was given to the JNF for establishing Jewish settlements.  Al-Kunayyisas  land was given to Mishmar Ayalon. However, according to Walid Khalidi, Mishmar Ayalon is on the land of Al-Qubab.

In 1992 the village site was described: "From a distance, the site looks like a big stone pile overgrown with a thicket of thorns. More than thirty partially destroyed buildings, including houses, still stand. The remains of arched doors and windows are visible. Fig, almond, olive, and pomegranate trees and cactuses grow among the buildings. The lands in the vicinity are cultivated by the nearby kibbutz; some are planted with cotton."

References

Bibliography

External links
Welcome To al-Kunayyisa
 al-Kunayyisa, Zochrot
Survey of Western Palestine, Map 17:   IAA, Wikimedia commons
al-Kunayyisa from the Khalil Sakakini Cultural Center

Arab villages depopulated during the 1948 Arab–Israeli War
District of Ramla